George Ayling  (14 November 1919 – 9 October 1964) was an English soldier and cricket umpire in India. He stood in one Test match, India vs. Australia, in 1956.

Born in Kent, Ayling was a regimental sergeant-major in the Grenadier Guards. He was on loan to the Government of India, stationed at the National Defence Academy in Khadakwasla, Pune, when he took up cricket umpiring. He progressed from services matches to Ranji Trophy matches in the 1954-55 season, and officiated in the Third Test of India's series against Australia in 1956-57. He intended to retire from military service and return to England to become a professional umpire. Back in England, he took up the position of regimental sergeant-major at Eton College, but died there suddenly of illness, aged 44.

While in India, Ayling was appointed MBE in the 1955 Birthday Honours.

See also
 List of Test cricket umpires
 Australian cricket team in India in 1956–57

References

1919 births
1964 deaths
People from Northfleet
Grenadier Guards officers
Indian Test cricket umpires
Members of the Order of the British Empire